The High School Football National Championship is a national championship honor awarded to the best high school football team(s) in the United States of America based on rankings from prep experts and analysts in the media, such as USA Today, and algorithmic rankings. There have also been some efforts over the years at organizing a single-game playoff for the national championship.

Background
The oldest of the rating systems, the National Sports News Service, was begun by Arthur H. "Art" Johlfs—who originally started naming champions informally in 1927 as a 21 year old high school coach and official, but did so more formally starting in 1959 after enlarging his network of supporting hobbyists to receive reports from six separate areas of the country. One of those hobbyists was Barrett Conley "Barry" Sollenberger, representing the NSNS' Southwest Sports News Service regional office. Sollenberger was the facilitator of a similar poll for Joe Namath's National Prep Sports magazine in 1976 and 1977, before that publication was discontinued (its Hertz Trophy was awarded each year to Moeller of Cincinnati, which also happened to be both of the top picks of the NSNS). Despite Sollenberger publicly disagreeing with Johlfs' choice for champion in 1978 (siding with St. Paul of Santa Fe Springs, California over Annandale of Virginia), Johlfs apparently still respected the way that Sollenberger actively ran his southwest office—enough so that he turned the NSNS rankings over to him, starting in 1979. The NSNS poll then remained under Sollenberger's management through 1999 (along the way he also retroactively picked back as far as 1910, although at least one source has the NSNS even making a 1904 selection as well). It was then merged away into R. Douglas "Doug" Huff's year-old, competing FAB 50 poll starting in 2000—which in turn continued on through 2014 with Mark J. Tennis apparently retaining the rights to it. An early compilation listing of NSNS champions does not necessarily match a more recent listing. It is not immediately clear if these discrepancies are due to poor record-keeping, or if Sollenberger or Huff adjusted the list of champions over the years as new information came to light—or if they simply just disagreed with Johlfs' picks. Johlfs, for his part, described how he arrived at choosing a champion: he accepted input from Minnesota college and professional coaches, reviewed game statistics, films, and press clippings, and considered the school's enrollment size. Johlfs said that his picks initially tended to be midwestern schools but shifted southward, because southern schools tended to play more games and were also allowed to compete in postseason playoffs. He was also known to keep a champion as the top-ranked team indefinitely in subsequent seasons' rankings as long as another team had not beaten them yet; this ended up allowing multiple teams to repeat as champions, drawing some criticism to Johlfs. Sollenberger, on the other hand, primarily determined champions by attending prominent games in person, while also consulting college football coaching staffs. He further acknowledged factoring in teams' past histories and their success in the larger population centers of the day when considering teams for his poll—usually including three teams from California and two teams each from Illinois, Ohio, Pennsylvania, and Texas in his rankings. Notably, Florida had a relatively sizable number of repeat champions in Johlfs' rating system but saw a significant drop in its number of champions under Sollenberger. As for Huff, he too had his own unique way of determining champions: "I try to put credibility in the listings by making them consistent with local and state rankings. I try to look for dominant teams in an area who have a good track record."

Informal intersectional games deemed as "national championship games" by the two participating schools were also, on occasion, sometimes played. Sometimes a dominant team in one state would defeat a dominant team in a neighboring state after the regular season and then would self-claim the national championship. However, sometimes such a game could not be scheduled, like in 1936 after Washington of Massillon, Ohio, refused to withhold its black players in a proposed game with segregated Central of Knoxville, Tennessee. Central subsequently proclaimed itself national champion that year. On December 31, 1938, duPont Manual of Louisville, Kentucky, and New Britain of Connecticut played in an actual national championship game at Tiger Stadium in Baton Rouge, Louisiana with a formal, third-party sponsor, the Louisiana Sports Association–and, by extension, the Sugar Bowl Committee, which held a series of sporting events leading up to the Sugar Bowl game itself. Manual won, 28–20. The following year, on December 30, the game featured Pine Bluff of Arkansas, which defeated Baton Rouge by a score of 26–0. This series of games proved difficult to organize, due to some states' prohibition of postseason play; Pine Bluff, for example, had to receive a special waiver from its state's high school sports association to participate in the game (even some schools that were eligible for postseason games like Massillon Washington were unable to play in the contest, since their association only allowed postseason games through the month of November). Also in 1939, the National Sports Council, chaired by columnist Grantland Rice, staged a national championship game Christmas night in the Miami Orange Bowl, won by Garfield of New Jersey, 16-13, over Miami of Florida; unlike the LSA Game, it featured two undefeated and untied teams from different sections of the country. After World War II the National Federation of State High School Associations also began discouraging intersectional postseason games.

Team and coaching superlatives
Concord, California De La Salle won 12 total national championships from 1994 to 2015, including 6 in a row from 1998 to 2003.

The first 10 of De La Salle's titles were coached by Bob Ladouceur, including all of those acquired during the 6-year streak. Todd Dodge (Southlake, Texas Carroll from 2004 to 2006 and Austin, Texas Westlake in 2020) is the only head coach to lead 2 different schools to national championships. Tony Sanchez (Las Vegas, Nevada Bishop Gorman in 2014) and Kenny Sanchez (Bishop Gorman in 2015 and 2016) are the only brothers to lead a school to a national championship.

At 63 years, McKinley (Canton, Ohio) holds the record for longest span between first title (1934) and most recent (1997). Bruce Rollinson of Mater Dei High School (Santa Ana, California) holds the largest span for a coach with 27 years between first title (1994) and most recent (2021) with 4 additional outright or shared titles during that span (1996, 2017, 2018, 2020).

Selectors

Current Selectors

Historical Selectors 

Bold type indicates current selectorsNotes: *—it is not immediately clear if these games were only scheduled between the two competing teams and base their authority on general acclamation, or if any or all of these games had an independent third party formally sponsor it to increase legitimacy; **—National Sports News Service rankings were merged into the Fox FAB 50 rankings, beginning in 2000; †—USA High School Football rankings were split into public and private school divisions, beginning in 2013; ‡—American Football Monthly rankings were split into public and private school divisions, beginning in 2005

National champions by year

Composite 

Note: all information between 1904 and 2000 is derived from the National High School Football Record Book (2001), unless otherwise specified; *—listings from an earlier source do not necessarily match listings from a more recent source—it is not immediately clear if this was due to poor record-keeping or if past champions were later reevaluated by the National Sports News Service and revised accordingly.

Most Selectors 
No definitive ranking service exists to declare a universal national champion for high school football. Since 2000, five teams have received a consensus 100% of selectors: Las Vegas (NV) Bishop Gorman (2016), Santa Ana (CA) Mater Dei (2017, 2021) and Bellflower (CA) St. John Bosco (2019, 2022).

Since 1982, four schools have received the most selectors in consecutive seasons: Concord (CA) De La Salle (2000–2003), Santa Ana (CA) Mater Dei (2017–2018), Southlake (TX) Carroll (2004–2006) and Hampton (VA) (1996–1997).

By Current Selector

National championships by school

Composite 
Years selected for overall national championships are denoted by boldfaced type below; years selected for specialty national championships that were reserved for specific kinds of schools (such as for private, public, medium or small-sized schools only) are in regular type. It is theoretically possible that some early national championship games held when segregation was legal may have restricted qualifying schools to all-white rosters, but in the absence of incriminating documentation, all championship games are currently assumed to have been open to all teams and are therefore listed below in boldface.

Most Selectors

See also
USA Today All-USA high school football team (including Super 25 teams in U.S. and Top 10 teams in East, South, Midwest, and West regions)
All-American Bowl (high school football)

References

https://commons.wikimedia.org/wiki/File:NSNS_1978_HS_Football_Ranking.jpg

High school football trophies and awards in the United States